The 2022 Florida State Seminoles women's soccer team represented Florida State University during the 2022 NCAA Division I women's soccer season. It was the 28th season of the university fielding a program. The Seminoles were led by first-year head coach Brian Pensky, who was hired prior to the season to replace long time coach Mark Krikorian.

Florida State finished the season 17–3–3 and 8–2–0 in ACC play to finish in a tie for first place.  As the second seed in the ACC Tournament, they received a bye into the Semifinals where they hosted Notre Dame.  The match ended in a 3–3 draw and Florida State won the ensuing penalty shoot-out 4–2 to advance to the Final.  In the Final, they defeated North Carolina to successfully defend their ACC Tournament title.  As tournament champions, they received an automatic bid to the NCAA Tournament and were the first seed in the Florida State Bracket.  They defeated  in the First Round, eight-seed  in the Second Round, and four-seed Pittsburgh in the Round of 16.  They hosted third-seed  in the Quarterfinals and won 1–0.  This set up a rematch with North Carolina in the Semifinals.  This time, North Carolina came out on top 3–2 to end the Seminoles' season.

Previous season

The Seminoles finished the season 21–1–3 and 7–1–2 in ACC play to finish in second place.  As the second seed in the ACC Tournament, they defeated Wake Forest and Virginia to win the tournament.  The win was the program's eighth ACC Tournament title.  The Seminoles received an automatic bid to the NCAA Tournament and were awarded a number one seed.  The Seminoles defeated South Alabama, SMU, Pepperdine, Michigan, and Rutgers on their way to the tournament final.  In the final, they defeated BYU in a penalty shoot-out to be crowned National Champions. Following the season, Krikorian resigned as head coach.

Offseason

Departures

Incoming Transfers

Recruiting Class

Squad

Roster

Team management 

Source:

Schedule

Source:

|-
!colspan=6 style=""| Non-conference Regular season

|-
!colspan=6 style=""| ACC Regular season

|-
!colspan=6 style=""| ACC Tournament

|-
!colspan=6 style=""| NCAA Tournament

Awards and honors

Rankings

NWSL Draft

References 

Florida State
Florida State
Florida State women's soccer
2022
Florida State